Apenburg is a village and a former municipality in the district Altmarkkreis Salzwedel, in Saxony-Anhalt, Germany. Since 1 July 2009, it is part of the municipality Apenburg-Winterfeld.

History 
Apenburg became a town during the Middle Ages.  Following World War II, it became part of East Germany.

Footnotes 

Altmarkkreis Salzwedel